Absalom Harris Chappell (December 18, 1801 – December 11, 1878) was an American politician and lawyer. He was a slaveholder. He served in the Georgia House of Representatives, Georgia Senate, and U.S. House of Representatives.

Chappell was born in Mount Zion, Georgia, the oldest son of Joseph and Dorothy Harris Chappell. He attended the University of Georgia in Athens in 1820; however, he did not graduate from the school. Chappell continued the study of law under the tutelage of Augustin Smith Clayton, passed the state bar exam, and became a practicing lawyer.

Chappell was elected as to the Georgia Senate in 1832 and 1833 and served in the Georgia House of Representatives from 1834 through 1839. Upon the resignation of Representative-elect John B. Lamar, Chappell was elected as his replacement in the U.S. House of Representatives in 1843 and served in that position until 1845 when he did not seek re-election. Chappell was subsequently elected to one more term as a state senator in 1845 and served as the president of that body.

In 1842 he married Loretto Rebecca Lamar, the younger sister of Judge Lucius Quintus Cincinnatus Lamar (I) and Mirabeau B. Lamar, second President of Texas.  The Chappells had five children who survived to adulthood. Their four sons had prominent careers. One as a president of normal schools and another as a state legislator.

Chappell died in Columbus, Georgia in 1878 and was buried in Linwood Cemetery in that same city.

References

History of the University of Georgia, Thomas Walter Reed,  Imprint:  Athens, Georgia : University of Georgia, ca. 1949 p.188
William J. Northen,  Men of Mark in Georgia, A. B. Caldwell, 1912, p. 285.
"Lamar-Chappell Collection (MC 1)Historical Note" Columbus State University

1801 births
1878 deaths
People from Carroll County, Georgia
Georgia (U.S. state) state senators
Members of the Georgia House of Representatives
Georgia (U.S. state) lawyers
University of Georgia people
Whig Party members of the United States House of Representatives from Georgia (U.S. state)
American slave owners
19th-century American politicians
19th-century American lawyers